John Carpenter (born 1948) is an American film director, screenwriter, producer, actor, and film music composer.

John Carpenter may also refer to:

 John Carpenter (born 1948), American filmmaker
 John A. Carpenter (1912–1978), American historian
 John Alden Carpenter (1876–1951), American composer
 John Barker Carpenter (born 1930), American basketball coach
 John C. Carpenter (politician) (1930–2016), American businessman, rancher, and politician
 John Henry Carpenter (1928–1998), accused of the 1978 murder of actor Bob Crane
 John Jo Carpenter, pseudonym of John H. Reese, American author of Western and crime fiction
 John M. Carpenter, American nuclear engineer
 John Stilley Carpenter (1849–1925), pioneer settler of Utah
 John W. Carpenter (1881–1959), Texas businessman and agriculturist
 John Wilson Carpenter III (1916–1996), U.S. Air Force general
 John Carpenter, 4th Earl of Tyrconnell (1790–1853),  British peer
 John Carpenter (archbishop of Dublin) (died 1786), Roman Catholic archbishop of Dublin
 John Carpenter (athlete) (1884–1933), American athlete who competed in the 1908 Summer Olympics
 John Carpenter (bishop of Worcester) (1399–1476), bishop of Worcester
 John Carpenter (footballer) (born 1948), Australian rules footballer for Essendon
 John Carpenter (game show contestant) (born 1967), first $1 million winner on the game show Who Wants to Be a Millionaire
 John Carpenter (referee) (1936–2021), Irish football referee
 John Carpenter (town clerk) (died 1442), founder of the City of London School
 John Carpenter (British Army officer) (1894−1967)
 John Boyd-Carpenter, Baron Boyd-Carpenter (1908–1998), British politician

See also
 Johnny Carpenter (1914–2003), American film actor, screenwriter and producer
 John W. Carpenter Freeway, Irving, Texas, USA
 John Carpenter Garnier (born Carpenter) (1839–1926), English Conservative politician who sat in the House of Commons from 1873 to 1884
Jack Carpenter (disambiguation)

See more
 List of people with surname Carpenter, for real and fictional Carpenters
 Carpenter (disambiguation), for Carpenter named communities, natural features, and man-made features
 Historic Carpenter Houses, for houses, homes, shops, homesteads, farmsteads, or other partially named or hyphenated named places with "Carpenter" or a similar meaning name